Attack Alarm is a 1941 thriller novel by the British writer Hammond Innes. It was inspired by the author's own experience as an anti-aircraft gunner at RAF Kenley during the Battle of Britain. In fact, according to Adrian Jack, the manuscript "was written on a gun-site after he had joined the Royal Artillery". 

It was published in the United States the following year by Macmillan.

Synopsis
In the summer of 1940, as the battle between the British and German air forces continues a former Fleet Street journalist now a gunner serving in an anti-aircraft battery begins to suspect that there may be a plot on the ground even more dangerous to his country than the enemy planes.

References

Bibliography
 James Vinson & D. L. Kirkpatrick. Contemporary Novelists. St. James Press, 1986.

1941 British novels
Novels by Hammond Innes
British thriller novels
William Collins, Sons books